Belladonna is a 2005 studio album by the Canadian singer-songwriter and producer Daniel Lanois.

One track on the album, "The Deadly Nightshade", had earlier been released on a 1996 album by Geoffrey Oryema as "LPJ Christine", although the version on Belladonna is without Oryema's vocals.

Track listing
 "Two Worlds" - 2:03
 "Sketches" - 4:24
 "Oaxaca" - 2:50
 "Agave" - 1:59
 "Telco" - 3:34
 "Desert Rose" - 1:52
 "Carla" - 2:02
 "The Deadly Nightshade" - 4:06
 "Dusty" - 1:39
 "Frozen" - 3:17
 "Panorama" - 3:01
 "Flametop Green" - 2:27
 "Todos Santos" - 5:32

Personnel

 Daniel Lanois - pedal steel guitar
 Malcolm Burn - keyboards, guitar 
 Aaron Embry - piano, guitar
 Brad Mehldau - piano
 Bill Dillon - guitar 
 Daryl Johnson - bass 
 Brian Blade - drums
 Victor Indrizzo - drums 
 Gilbert Castellanos - trumpet
 Michael Dessen - trombone
 Adam Samuels - audio mixer

References

 

2005 albums
Daniel Lanois albums
Albums produced by Daniel Lanois
Anti- (record label) albums
Juno Award for Instrumental Album of the Year albums